Elizabeth Jane Mary Edwards,  (born 24 February 1952) is a visual and historical anthropologist.

Career 
Born on 24 February 1952, Elizabeth Jane Mary Edwards is Professor Emerita of Photographic History at De Montfort University; Curator Emerita at Pitt Rivers Museum, University of Oxford; Research Associate at the Institute of Social and Cultural Anthropology, University of Oxford; and Honorary Professor in the Department of Anthropology at University College London. In 2017 she was appointed the Andrew W. Mellon Visiting Professor at the V&A Research Institute, London. Her focus of research is the relationship between photography, history and anthropology, and includes investigations of photography and historical imagination, the social practices of photography, and the materiality of photographs.

Edwards was previously the Director of the Photographic History Research Centre (PHRC) at De Montfort University, and was the Curator of Photographs at Pitt Rivers Museum and lecturer in visual anthropology at the University of Oxford,  and Professor at the University of the Arts London. She was featured as one of the major writers on photography of all time in 'Fifty Key Writers on Photography'.

In 2015 Edwards was elected to Fellow of the British Academy. She was given a Lifetime Achievement Award by the Society for Visual Anthropology (American Anthropological Association) in 2014. Edwards is a Fellow of the Royal Anthropological Institute, and was vice-president between 2009 and 2012.  She is also a past Chair of the Museum Ethnographers Group.  In 2020, Edwards was given the J Dudley Johnston Award of the Royal Photographic Society.

Selected publications 

Durden, Mark, editor (2012), Fifty Key Writers on Photography, Key Guides, Routledge, 

Christopher Morton and Elizabeth Edwards, editors (2009), Photography, Anthropology and History: Expanding the Frame, Ashgate,

References

External links 
 BBC Radio 4 In Our Time The Invention of Photography. Edwards on the expert panel with Simon Schaffer and Alison Morrison-Low.
 Durham University IAS public lecture https://www.dur.ac.uk/resources/ias/audio/Edwards.mp3
 PhotoCLEC. 'Photographs, Colonial Legacy and Museums in Contemporary European Culture' http://photoclec.dmu.ac.uk

British women historians
Academics of De Montfort University
Photography academics
Academics of the University of the Arts London
Fellows of the Royal Anthropological Institute of Great Britain and Ireland
Fellows of the British Academy
Living people
1952 births
Historians of photography